Staphylococcus kloosii in a gram-positive, coagulase-negative member of the bacterial genus Staphylococcus consisting of single, paired, and clustered cocci. Strains of this species were originally isolated from and among the most frequent constituents of normal skin flora and various wild animals.

References

Further reading

External links
 Taxon Passport Staphylococcus kloosii
 UniProt Taxonomy: Staphylococcus kloosii
Type strain of Staphylococcus kloosii at BacDive -  the Bacterial Diversity Metadatabase

kloosii
Bacteria described in 1985